Crane Creek Township may refer to the following townships in the United States:

 Crane Creek Township, Mason County, Illinois
 Crane Creek Township, Barry County, Missouri

Township name disambiguation pages